Sabujpatra (English: Green Leaf) was a liberal and pro-Tagore Bengali magazine. It was named Sabujpatra as its cover page was illustrated by a green palmleaf drawn by Nandalal Bose (no other colors were ever used). It was edited by Pramatha Chaudhuri and first published on 25th Baishakh 1321 BS (April 1914). He was mentored and inspired by Rabindranath Tagore to publish such a journal. The magazine shunned advertisements and pictures to uphold about the ideals and standards the editor believed in. In the first phase it was being published up to 1329 BS (1922). Its second phase started in 1332 BS. The magazine finally folded in 1334 BS (1927).

Though short-lived, Sabujpatra was a major force in remolding Bengali language and literary style for the post-First World War generation. Pramatha Choudhury endeavored to introduce new literary ideals, preferred spoken Bengali to the written and a new style of writing, often called 'Birbali', after his pseudonym 'Birbal'. From then forward, the colloquial Bengali is dominating the Bengali literary scene. Even Tagore's later prose works and modern Bengali literature vindicates the success of Sabujpatra's motto.

Sabujpatra initially contained writings from Rabindranath Tagore, Satyendranath Dutta and the editor himself. Some of the intellectuals who gathered around Pramatha Chowdhury became literary luminaries later. Dhurjatiprasad Mukhopadhyay, Atul Chandra Gupta, Barada Charan Gupta, Suniti Kumar Chatterji, Kiranshankar Roy wrote articles in Sabujpatra; Kanti Chandra Ghosh, Amiya Chakraborty and Suresh Chakraborty contributed poems. In everything it published, Sabujpatra expressed the spirit of freethinking and advocated rationalism, democracy and individual freedom.

Paschimbanga Bangla Akademi Library, Kolkata has archived a complete set of Sabujpatra.

Appearance

Sabujpatra made its debut in April, 1914. In the very first issue, the editor clarified the ideals and objectives of the magazine:

Of the name of the journal, Chaudhuri asserted:

Rabindranath Tagore and Sabuj Patra

Rabindranath Tagore was a regular contributor to Sabuj Patra. Many of his early 20th century works including the Balaka poems, two of his novels, Ghare Baire and Chaturanga, a play titled Phalguni and a considerable lot of short stories and essays were published in this journal.

In Sabuj Patra, Tagore expressed his revolutionary view on society and political situations of contemporary times through his fiction and prose. Haimanti and Streer Patra caused a frown of contemporary Bengali society as well as his essays Bastab and Lokohito were severely attacked in conservative journals like Sahitya and Narayan.

Other contributors of Sabuj Patra

Among the contributors other than Chaudhuri himself and Tagore, there were Atul Chandra Gupta, Kiran Shankar Roy, Satish Chandra Ghatak, Satyendra Nath Bose, Barada Charan Gupta, Suniti Kumar Chatterjee, Suresh Chandra Banerjee, Suresh Chandra Chakravarti, Dhurjati Prasad Mukherjee, Biswapati Chaudhuri, Harik Krishna Dev and Indira Devi Chaudhurani. "A close scrutiny of these writers would reveal that they stood firmly for a rational intellect free of inhibitions or emotions,"

References

1914 establishments in India
1927 disestablishments in India
Bengali-language magazines
Defunct literary magazines
Defunct magazines published in India
Literary magazines published in India
Magazines established in 1914
Magazines disestablished in 1927
Works by Rabindranath Tagore